Manchán Magan is an Irish writer, traveller, author, and television programme maker.

Career
Magan has made over 70 travel documentaries focusing on issues of world cultures and globalisation, 12 of them packaged under the Global Nomad series with his brother Ruán Magan.

He presented No Béarla, a documentary series about travelling around Ireland speaking only Irish. He writes regularly for The Irish Times and presents the podcast/radio show 'The Almanac of Ireland', on RTÉ Radio 1<ref>[https://www.rte.ie/radio/podcasts/series/32164-the-almanac-of-ireland/ RTÉ Radio 1, The Almanac of Ireland']</ref>

He has written three books in Irish, Baba-ji agus TnaG, Manchán ar Seachrán and Bí i nGrá. His English travel books include Angels & Rabies: A Journey through the Americas, Manchán's Travels: A Journey through India, and Truck Fever: A Journey through Africa. In 2009 he spent time as a writer in residence with the Irish Cultural Centre, at the Irish College in Paris.

In 2020, Magan published Thirty Two Words for Field: Lost words of the Irish landscape.'' In 2021 he published the children's book 'Tree Dogs, Banshee Fingers and Other Words for Nature' with illustrations by Steve Doogan. And in 2022 his book 'Listen to the Land Speak' was published by Gill Books.

His television series include, Crainn na hÉireann, a 10-part series on the trees of Ireland. An Fód Deireannach, a 4-part series for TG4 about Irish bogs and peatland.

Background
Magan's family background was nationalist and closely associated with the foundation of the Irish State in that he is the grandson of Sheila Humphreys and great-grandnephew of The O'Rahilly. He has explored these connections in various documentaries for TG4 and RTÉ.

Magan stood unsuccessfully for the Green Party in the Longford–Westmeath constituency in 2016. He built and lived in a strawbale house, which he removed and replaced with a mud and cement, grass-roofed house, in Co. Westmeath.

Brought up in Donnybrook, Dublin, he went to Mount Anville Montessori School before attending Gonzaga College in Ranelagh (he also spent one year in Colaiste Rhinne),  before going to University College Dublin.

See also
Ruán Magan

References

External links
 Official website
 

20th-century Irish people
21st-century Irish people
Living people
Irish documentary filmmakers
Irish language activists
21st-century travel writers
Irish travel writers
RTÉ Radio 1 presenters
RTÉ television presenters
TG4 presenters
Irish television presenters
The Irish Times people
People educated at Gonzaga College
1968 births